Chain story may refer to:

Chain novel
Cumulative tale